Nephin Beg or Nefin Beg is a mountain in the Nephin Beg Range in north County Mayo, Ireland. The mountain takes its name from Nephin, although that mountain is some distance away and there are intervening mountains between them.

References

External links
 Nephin Beg on mountainviews.ie

Mountains and hills of County Mayo
Mountains under 1000 metres